Scott Robertson (born 27 July 2001) is a Scottish professional footballer who plays as a central midfielder for EFL League One club Fleetwood Town.

Career

Celtic
Raised in Lenzie and a product of the club's youth system, Robertson made his senior debut aged 18 in a 2019–20 UEFA Europa League group stage fixture against CFR Cluj on 12 December 2019; with Celtic's final position at the head of the table already confirmed, a below-strength team lost 2–0. He had already featured for Celtic's under-21 team in the 2018–19 and 2019–20 editions of the Scottish Challenge Cup, scoring in a defeat to Falkirk, and in July 2019, a few days before he turned 18, signed a contract running until summer 2021.

Loan spells

In September 2020, he joined Gillingham on a season-long loan. He made his debut for the club coming on as a substitute in a 2-0 defeat to Hull City. After making 15 league appearances for the Gills, Robertson was recalled by Celtic on 11 January 2021.

On 30 January 2021, Robertson joined League One side Doncaster Rovers on loan for the remainder of the 2020–21 season.

On 30 August 2021, Robertson returned to England to join Crewe Alexandra on loan for the 2021–22 season. He made his Crewe debut the following day, 31 August, in a 1–0 victory at Shrewsbury Town in an EFL Trophy group tie. Just over a month later, on 2 October 2021, he scored his first Crewe goal in a 2–2 draw with Cambridge United at Gresty Road. Injured in Crewe's league game at Accrington Stanley on 12 February 2022, Robertson had an operation and returned to Celtic to continue his rehabilitation in March 2022.

Fleetwood Town 
On 20 January 2023, Robertson made a permanent transfer to League One club Fleetwood Town, signing a two-and-a-half year contract.

Career statistics

References

2001 births
Living people
People educated at St Ninian's High School, Kirkintilloch
Sportspeople from Lenzie
Scottish footballers
Association football midfielders
English Football League players
Celtic F.C. players
Gillingham F.C. players
Doncaster Rovers F.C. players
Crewe Alexandra F.C. players
Fleetwood Town F.C. players